The Fokker PW-5 (designated Fokker F VI by Fokker) was a Dutch fighter aircraft of the 1920s.  It was a parasol monoplane of which  twelve were built for the US Army Air Service, being used as advanced trainers.

Design and development

In 1921, the US Army Air Service evaluated the Fokker D.VIII parasol monoplane, and the D.VII biplane, both fighters handed over to it after the Armistice with Germany that ended World War I. It placed an order for two examples of a parasol monoplane fighter based on the design of the D.VIII, but powered by an American-built Hispano-Suiza V-8 engine, for evaluation. These aircraft, designated by Fokker as Fokker F VI, had plywood-covered wooden cantilever wings similar to those in the D.VIII and the contemporary D.X fighters, and a typical Fokker welded steel-tube fuselage. The forward fuselage was protected by armour plates, although the car-type radiator and the wing-mounted fuel tank had no such protection. The aircraft had a fixed tailskid undercarriage, while it had no fixed fin, having a balanced rudder instead.

Operational history
In 1921, the two evaluation examples were delivered in 1921, although one of them crashed on 13 March 1922 when its wing failed owing to flutter. An order for a further 10 aircraft was placed, and delivered later in 1921, the aircraft being used as advanced trainers by the 1st Pursuit Group.

Operators

US Army Air Service
1st Pursuit Group.

Specifications (PW-5)

See also

Notes

References

 Dorr, Robert F. and David Donald. Fighters of the United States Air Force. London:Temple Press/Aerospace, 1990. .
 Green, William and Gordon Swanborough. The Complete Book of Fighters. New York:Smithmark, 1994. .
 Weyl, A. R. Fokker: The Creative Years. London:Putnam, 1965.

External links

 Photo

1920s Dutch fighter aircraft
PW-05
Aircraft first flown in 1921
High-wing aircraft